Kaala Aadmi is a 1978 Bollywood film directed by Ramesh Lakhanpal.

Cast
Sunil Dutt as Birju   
Saira Banu as Sheetal 
Pran as Dharam Prakash  
Ranjeet as Hari Prakash
Premnath as Guruji (Special Appearance)
Parikshat Sahni as Aslam
Naaz as Sayeeda
Sonia Sahni as Hari's Wife
Zaheera as Birju's Keep
Anwar Hussain as Ajit
Satyendra Kapoor as Mr. Gupta
Urmila Bhatt as Mrs. Gupta  
Helen   
Jayshree T.     
Alankar Joshi

Music
Lyrics: Verma Malik

External links
 

1978 films
1970s Hindi-language films
Films scored by Laxmikant–Pyarelal